The Jacques Léglise Trophy is an annual amateur boys' team golf competition between Great Britain & Ireland and the Continent of Europe. It was first played in 1977, as a one-day match before the Boys Amateur Championship, but since 1996 it has been played as a separate two-day match. The venue generally alternates between Great Britain and Ireland and the continent. From 1958 to 1966 a similar match was played between a combined England and Scotland team and the Continent of Europe.

History
The event can trace its origins back to 1958. An England–Scotland boys match had been played since 1923 before the Boys Amateur Championship. In 1958 the match was played on the Friday and a match between a combined England and Scotland team and Europe was played on the Saturday. The English and Scottish selectors each chose four players to make up the British team. The match, consisting of four foursomes and eight singles matches, was very one-sided with the European team losing 11 of the 12 matches and halving the other. The 1959 match had only three foursomes matches and six singles. The Europeans won one of the foursomes and halved two of the singles. The 1960 match had five foursomes matches and ten singles. The match was close with the continental team winning two of the foursomes matches and five of the singles. In 1961, the continental team lost all five foursomes matches but won four of the singles matches. In 1962, the score was the same with the continent winning one foursomes match and three singles, while in 1963 they won two foursomes matches and one singles. The 1964 and 1965 contests had four foursomes matches and nine singles. The Continental team won just one singles match on each occasion  The 1966 match wes reduced to four foursomes and eight singles, the continental team winning just two singles matches. The combined England and Scotland team had dominated to such an extent that it was discontinued after 1966, and replaced by an annual youth international, played before the British Youths Open Amateur Championship and which was held for the first time in 1967.

The boys match was revived in 1977 when Jean-Louis Dupont donated a trophy in memory of Jacques Léglise, who had been president of the French Golf Federation and of the European Golf Association. There were four foursomes and nine singles matches and the Continental team won for the first time. In 1978 the Continental team won again by the same score, 7–6.  From 1979 the number of singles match was reduced to eight. In 1993 the match was extended, with five foursomes and ten singles matches Up to 1995 it was played over a single day in connection with the Boys Amateur Championship.

Since 1996 it has been played as a separate two-day match with the venue generally alternating between Great Britain and Ireland and the continent. There were 10 players in each team in 1996 reduced to 9 since 1997. From 1996 to 2014 both days had four foursomes in the morning and eight singles matches in the afternoon. From 2015, there have been nine singles matches on the final afternoon.

Format
Currently the teams are nine strong and the tournament is played over two days, with four foursomes in the morning and either eight or nine singles matches in the afternoon. The Great Britain and Ireland team is selected by The R&A and the Continent of Europe side by the European Golf Association. Players must be under 18 on 1 January of the year in which the event takes place.

In recent years the Great Britain and Ireland team have chosen a captain from among the players; in addition to a non-playing manager. The Continent of Europe side has a non-playing captain.

Results
Since the event was revived in 1977, the Great Britain & Ireland team has won the event 29 times, while Continent of Europe has 15 victories. The 2015 match ended in a tie and so Great Britain & Ireland retained the trophy.

Future sites 
2023 - France
2024 - West Lancashire

Teams
There have been 9 players in each team since 1997.

Great Britain & Ireland
2022 Josh Berry, Connor Graham, Josh Hill, Frank Kennedy, Oliver Mukherjee, Dylan Shaw-Radford, Niall Shiels Donegal, Harley Smith, Tyler Weaver
2021 Cameron Adam, Jack Bigham, Daniel Bullen, Archie Finnie, Connor Graham, Josh Hill, Joshua Hill, Ruben Lindsay, Harley Smith
2019 Barclay Brown, Archie Davies, Joshua Hill, Aaron Marshall, Tom McKibbin, Connor McKinney, Luke O'Neill, Joe Pagdin, Ben Schmidt
2018 Barclay Brown, Archie Davies, Conor Gough, Max Hopkins, Tom McKibbin, Connor McKinney, Joe Pagdin, Mark Power, Robin Williams
2017 Toby Briggs, Alex Fitzpatrick, Luke Harries, Darren Howie, Ben Jones, Thomas Plumb, Mark Power, Charlie Strickland, Robin Williams
2016 Toby Briggs, Alex Fitzpatrick, Harry Goddard, Kevin LeBlanc, Thomas Mulligan, Marco Penge, Mark Power, Jamie Stewart, Charlie Strickland
2015 Ben Chamberlain, Will Enefer, Calum Fyfe, Tim Harry, Bradley Moore, Thomas Mulligan, Marco Penge, Sandy Scott, Tom Williams
2014 George Burns, Jamie Dick, Ewen Ferguson, Tim Harry, Rowan Lester, Haydn McCullen, Bradley Moore, Marco Penge, Ashton Turner
2013 Ben Amor, Robin Dawson, Ewen Ferguson, Robert MacIntyre, Bradley Moore, Bradley Neil, Marco Penge, Connor Syme, Ashton Turner
2012 Harry Ellis, Matt Fitzpatrick, Alex Gleeson, Patrick Kelly, Gavin Moynihan, Bradley Neil, Max Orrin, Toby Tree, Ashton Turner
2011 David Boote, Harrison Greenberry, Gary Hurley, Nathan Kimsey, Paul Kinnear, Dermot McElroy, Gavin Moynihan, Callum Shinkwin, Toby Tree
2010 James Burnett, Adam Carson, Paul Dunne, Grant Forrest, Scott Gibson, Chris Lloyd, Paul Lockwood, Dermot McElroy, Rhys Pugh
2009 Jonathan Bell, Adam Carson, Sebastian Crookall-Nixon, Paul Dunne, Tom Lewis, Chris Lloyd, Eddie Pepperell, Paul Shields, Max Smith
2008 Alan Dunbar, Ben Enoch, Tommy Fleetwood, Stiggy Hodgson, Gary King, Luke Lennox, Tom Lewis, Eddie Pepperell, Michael Stewart
2007 James Byrne, Paul Cutler, Tommy Fleetwood, Fraser Fotheringham, Matt Haines, Jack Hiluta, Andrew Johnston, Eddie Pepperell, Michael Stewart
2006 James Byrne, Paul Cutler, Rhys Enoch, Luke Goddard, Sam Hutsby, Niall Kearney, Lewis Kirton, Matthew Nixon, Adam Runcie
2005 Matt Evans, Zac Gould, Tom Haylock, Scott Henry, Steven McEwan, Tom Sherreard, Mark Trow, Simon Ward, Danny Willett
2004 Matthew Baldwin, Gary Boyd, Jordan Findlay, Zac Gould, Scott Henry, Cian McNamara, Aaron O'Callaghan, Paul O'Hara, John Parry
2003 Wallace Booth, Rhys Davies, Daniel Denison, Tommy Hunter, Cian McNamara, Aaron O'Callaghan, Lloyd Saltman, Gareth Shaw, Paul Waring
2002 Clancy Bowe, Rhys Davies, Farren Keenan, Jamie Moul, Mark Pilling, Matthew Richardson, Gareth Shaw, Michael Skelton, Paul Waring
2001 Clancy Bowe, Stephen Buckley, Chris Cousins, James Heath, Scott Jackson, Farren Keenan, David Porter, Niall Turner, Daniel Wardrop
2000 Yasin Ali, Stephen Buckley, Jack Doherty, David Inglis, Derek McNamara, David Porter, Zane Scotland, Richard Scott, Joshua Simons
1999 Nick Dougherty, Scott Godfrey, Sandeep Grewal, Barry Hume, David Inglis, Mark O'Sullivan, David Porter, David Price, Zane Scotland
1998 Ian Campbell, Nick Dougherty, Adam Frayne, Justin Kehoe, David Griffiths, David Jones, John MacDougall, Steven O'Hara, Robin Symes
1997 Ian Campbell, Mark Campbell, Graham Gordon, David Jones, Richard Jones, Neil Matthews, Lee Rhind, Justin Rose, Phil Rowe
1996 Martin Brown, Kenneth Ferrie, David Jones, Mark Loftus, Morgan Palmer, Oliver Pughe, Justin Rose, Phil Rowe, Graeme Storm, Daniel Sugrue
1995 Grant Campbell, Luke Donald, Carl Duke, Graham Fox, Craig Lee, Jamie Little, Denny Lucas, Morgan Palmer, Tim Rice, Steven Young
1994 Steven Craig, Carl Duke, Alastair Forsyth, Gary Harris, Jamie Harris, Craig Heap, Jamie Little, Ciaran McMonagle, Stephen Raybould, Steve Webster
1993 James Bunch, R Davies, Gary Harris, James Healey, David Howell, Andrew McCormick, Sean Quinlivan, Stephen Raybould, A Wall, Steven Young
1992 Scott Drummond, Andrew Farmer, Stephen Gallacher, Hugh McKibbin, David Park, Sean Quinlivan, Alan Reid, Iestyn Taylor
1991 Raymond Burns, Stuart Cage, Richie Coughlan, Bradley Dredge, Craig Hislop, Iain Pyman, Murray Urquhart, Lee Westwood
1990 Neil Archibald, Raymond Burns, Richie Coughlan, Matthew Ellis, Garry Jack, Neil Macrae, Michael Welch, Lee Westwood
1989 Raymond Burns, Colin Fraser, Ian Garbutt, Pádraig Harrington, Richard Johnson, Raymond Russell, Murray Urquhart, Carl Watts
1988 Colin Fraser, Pádraig Harrington, Martin Hastie, Richard Johnson, Paul Page, Stuart Paul, Mike Smith, Stuart Syme
1987 Stuart Bannerman, David Bathgate, Andrew Coltart, Steve Docherty, David Errity, Wayne Henry, Gary McNeill, Jim Payne
1986 Jason Bennett, Neil Duncan, Steve Edgley, Paddy Gribben, Wayne Henry, Graham King, James Lee, Alan Tait
1985 Peter Baker, J Cook, Craig Everett, Jason Farrell, Wayne Henry, Graham King, James Lee, Eoghan O'Connell
1984 Peter Baker, Mark Brennan, Jason Farrell, Andrew Hare, William Owen, Phillip Price, Alan Turnbull, Lee Vannet
1983 Peter Baker, Jim Carvill, Calum Innes, Michael Macara, Jeremy Robinson, Lee Vannet, Reeves Weedon, Keith Williams
1982 Colin Brooks, David Gilford, Graeme Miller, Jacky Montgomery, John Morris, Roddy Park, Chris Rees, Andrew Saines
1981 Keith Dobson, Michael Few, Ronald Gregan, Adam Hunter, John McHenry, Stewart Scott, Craig Stewart, Martin Thompson
1980 Alan Currie, David Curry, Andrew Glen, Ronald Gregan, Michael McLean, G Miller, Mark Roe, Paul Way
1979 Gordon Dalgleish, Ian Ferguson, Peter Hammond, Lindsay Mann, Malcolm MacKenzie, Ronan Rafferty, Mark Tomlinson, Duncan Weir
1978 Colin Dalgleish, Ross Fraser, Stephen Keppler, Brendan McDaid, Mark Mouland, Roy Mugglestone, Jonathan Plaxton, John Queen, David Whelan
1977 Jeremy Bennett, Frank Coutts, Colin Dalgleish, Paul Downes, Ian Ford, John Huggan, Stephen Keppler, Mark Mouland, Roy Mugglestone
1966 Alasdair Black, John Cook, Bernard Gallacher, Michael King, John McTear, Alastair Milne, Andrew Phillips, Peter Tupling
1965 Sinclair Ferguson, Andrew Forrester, Bernard Gallacher, James Garland, Bill Lockie, Peter Oosterhuis, Ronnie Penman, Andrew Phillips, Richard Slee
1964 Andrew Brooks, Bill Lockie, George McKay, Peter Oosterhuis, Gordon Robert, Richard Slee, Derek Small, W Thomson, Peter Townsend
1963 Iain Clark, Leslie Crawford, Rod Lambert, Bill Lockie, Finlay Morris, Reg Radway, David Rigby, Derek Small, John Threlfall, Peter Townsend
1962 Brian Barnes, John Campbell, Clive Clark, Bill Hogg, Finlay Morris, Tom Pattison, Cameron Penman, Peter Townsend, Peter Wingfield
1961 Scott Cochran, Malcolm Cowell, Robert Hayes, Tony Jacklin, Scott Macdonald, Douglas Miller, Finlay Morris, Cameron Penman, A Wilson, David Winslow
1960 Paul Baxter, David Brown, Peter Green, Malcolm Gregson, John Martin, John McIntyre, William Rodger, Alan Scott, John Sharp, K Thomson
1959 Peter Brown, Peter Green, Richard Langridge, Alan Scott, Eddie Shamash, Hugh Stuart
1958 Jimmy Grant, Michael Hoyle, Gordon Hyde, Richard Langridge, H McDonald, David Simons, Ian Smith, Bobby Walker

Continent of Europe
2022 Thijmen Batens, Marco Florioli, Oihan Guillamoundeguy, Tom Haberer, Albert Hansson, Jorge Siyuan Hao, Carl Siemens, Tim Wiedemeyer, William Wistrand
2021 Tiger Christensen, Riccardo Fantinelli, Marco Florioli, Oihan Guillamoundeguy, Yannick Malik, Flavio Michetti, Jaime Montojo, Daniel Svärd, Tim Wiedemeyer
2019 Bård Bjørnevik Skogen, Matteo Cristoni, Daniel Da Costa Rodrigues, Loïc Ettlin, Charles Larcelet, Alvaro Mueller-Baumgart Lucena, David Puig, Tom Vaillant, Adam Wallin
2018 Eemil Alajärvi, Daniel Da Costa Rodrigues, Loïc Ettlin, Jerry Ji, David Puig, Eduard Rousaud Sabate, Saku Tuusa, Kiet Van Der Weele, Adam Wallin
2017 Alejandro Aguilera, Markus Braadlie, Adrien Dumont de Chassart, Falko Hanisch, Rasmus Højgaard, Matias Honkala, Pedro Lencart Silva, David Nyfjäll, Eduard Rousaud Sabate
2016 Alejandro Aguilera, Edgar Catherine, Jonathan Goth-Rasmussen, Falko Hanisch, Pontus Nyholm, Adrien Pendaries, Kristoffer Reitan, Maximilian Schmitt, Marcus Svensson
2015 John Axelsen, Christoffer Bring, Viktor Hovland, Guido Migliozzi, Adrien Pendaries, Kristoffer Reitan, Maximilian Schmitt, Gisli Sveinbergsson, Tim Widing
2014 Oskar Bergqvist, Adam Blomme, Klaus Ganter, Marcus Kinhult, Stefano Mazzoli, Vitek Novak, Kristoffer Reitan, Vince van Veen, Federico Zuckermann
2013 Ivan Cantero, Paul Elissalde, Dominic Foos, Mario Galiano, Michael Hirmer, Romain Langasque, Nicolas Manifacier, Renato Paratore, Kristoffer Ventura
2012 Giulio Castagnara, Dominic Foos, Mario Galiano, Romain Langasque, Renato Paratore, Hannes Rönneblad, Matthias Schwab, Kenny Subregis, Victor Tärnström
2011 Thomas Detry, Robin Goger, Florian Loutre, Gonçalo Pinto, Jon Rahm, Max Rottluff, Javier Sainz, Kenny Subregis, Kristoffer Ventura
2010 Thomas Detry, Stanislas Gautier, Domenico Geminiani, Kristian Krogh Johannessen, Moritz Lampert, Markus Maukner, Adrián Otaegui, Thomas Pieters, Thomas Sørensen
2009 Lucas Bjerregaard, Emilio Cuartero, Pedro Figueiredo, Toni Hakula, Robin Kind, Moritz Lampert, Maximilian Röhrig, Kasper Sørensen, Romain Wattel
2008 Emilio Cuartero, Daniel Jennevret, Maximilian Kieffer, Fredrik Kollevold, Matteo Manassero, Carlos Pigem, Kasper Sørensen, Cristiano Terragni, Romain Wattel
2007 Nikolai Aagaard, Floris de Vries, Édouard Dubois, Sean Einhaus, Pedro Figueiredo, Maximilian Kieffer, Daniel Løkke, Matteo Manassero, Christiano Terragni
2006 Björn Åkesson, Victor Dubuisson, Pedro Figueiredo, Lluís García del Moral, Jesper Kennegård, Anders Kristiansen, Andrea Pavan, Tim Sluiter, Marius Thorp
2005 Tristan Bierenbroodspot, Floris de Vries, Lluís García del Moral, Nicklas Glans, Jesper Kennegård, Kajetan Kromer, Andrea Pavan, Tim Sluiter, Marius Thorp
2004 Gonzalo Berlin, Knut Børsheim, Jorge Campillo, Wouter de Vries, Xavier Feyaerts, Lluis Garcia del Moral, Peter-Max Hamm, Peter Meldgaard, Andrea Pavan
2003 Federico Colombo, Wouter de Vries, Matteo Delpodio, Lorenzo Gagli, Stephan Gross, Mike Lorenzo-Vera, Pablo Martín, Pierre Relecom, Bernd Wiesberger
2002 Gustav Adell, Antti Ahokas, Peter Baunsee, Rafa Cabrera-Bello, Carlos del Moral, Oscar Florén, Mike Lorenzo-Vera, Pablo Martín, Andrea Romano
2001 Gustav Adell, Simone Brizzolari, Rafa Cabrera-Bello, Alejandro Canizares, Raphaël de Sousa, Peter Erofejeff, Joachim Fourquet, Niklas Lemke, Bilbo Perrot
2000 Rafa Cabrera-Bello, Nicolas Colsaerts, Eduardo de la Riva, Raphaël de Sousa, Tim Ellis, Andreas Högberg, Alex Norén, Erik Stenman, Andrea Zanini
1999 Anders Bøgebjerg, Nicolas Colsaerts, Raphaël de Sousa, Xavier Guzmán, Anders Hofvander, Eirik Tage Johansen, Roberto Paolillo, Stefano Reale, Tuomas Tuovinen
1998 Raúl Ballesteros, Pascal Celhay, Nicolas Colsaerts, Michael Jørgensen, Mikko Korhonen, Edoardo Molinari, Roberto Paolillo, Stefano Reale, Rafael Vera
1997 Sergio García, Anders Hultman, Mikko Ilonen, Michael Jørgensen, Raúl Quirós, Stefano Reale, Ángel Luis Saura, Massimiliano Secci, Rafael Vera
1996 Joakim Bäckström, Kariem Baraka, Henrik Bjørnstad, Alexandre Henriques, Alessandro Napoleoni, Christian Nilsson, Christian Petersson, Raúl Quirós, Tino Schuster, Mads Vibe-Hastrup
1995 Joakim Bäckström, Christoph Bausek, Oliver David, Peter Davidsson, Sergio García, José Manuel Lara, Tino Schuster, Marco Soffietti, Philippe Touze, Mads Vibe-Hastrup
1994 Peter Davidsson, Henric Ingemarson, José Manuel Lara, David Smolin, Henrik Stenson, Michael Thannhäuser, Jonas Torines, Morten Vildhøj, Juan Vizcaya, Matteo Zaretti
1993 Kalle Brink, Johan Edfors, Diego Fiammengo, Richard Gillot, Viktor Gustavsson, Henric Ingemarson, Søren Kjeldsen, José Manuel Lara, Georges Plumet, Juan Vizcaya
1992 Thomas Biermann, Sébastien Delagrange, Petter Ederö, Freddie Jacobson, Christophe Ravetto, Luca Ruspa, Fabrice Stolear, Francisco Valera, Juan Vizcaya, Leif Westerberg
1991 Niels Boysen, Andrea Brotto, Didier de Vooght, Chris Hanell, Luca Ruspa, Rudi Sailer, Fabrice Stolear, Francisco Valera
1990 Patricio Beautell, Régis Bleze-Pascau, Francisco de Pablo, Frédéric Duger, Knut Ekjord, Mikael Persson, Johan Stålberg, Arild Townhill
1989 Carlos Beautell, Ralf Berhorst, Diego Borrego, Massimo Florioli, Marco Gortana, Gabriel Hjertstedt, Mikael Persson, Øyvind Rojahn
1988 Javier Ansorena, Thomas Bjørn, Diego Borrego, Frédéric Cupillard, Pierre Fulke, Jakob Greisen, Raimo Sjöberg, Jesper Thuen
1987 Eric Giraud, Jakob Greisen, Joakim Haeggman, Peter Hedblom, Peter Olsson, Nils Sallman, Ben Tinning, Romain Victor
1986 Jesús María Arruti, José Manuel Arruti, Joakim Haeggman, Nicola Hansen, Peter Hedblom, Lars Herne, Marco Mores, Marcello Santi
1985 Peter Digebjerg, Oliver Eckstein, Claus Gillitzer, Eric Giraud, Willem-Oege Goslings, Fredrlk Karlsson, Thomas Levet, Johan Remmelgas
1984 Søren Bjørn, Oliver Eckstein, Yvon Houssin, Fredrlk Karlsson, Friedrich Kötter, Adam Mednick, Henrik Simonsen, Daan Slooter
1983 Yago Beamonte, Håkan Eriksson, Jörg Kappmeier, Mikael Krantz, Fredrik Lindgren, José María Olazábal, Marc Pendariès, Peter Schwarze
1982 Emanuele Bolognesi, Luigi Figari, Ignacio Gervás, Jörg Kappmeier, Mikael Krantz, José María Olazábal, Jesper Parnevik, Marc Pendariès
1981 Tom Fredriksen, Christian Jung, Jesús López, José María Olazábal, Magnus Persson, Sergio Prati, Magnus Sunesson, Xavier Wenger
1980 G Chartier, G Comin, Marco Durante, Fabrizio Felici, Jesús López, Marc Pendariès, Magnus Persson, Steen Tinning
1979 Andrea Canessa, G Comin, Marco Durante, Jean-Charles Gassiat, Silvio Grappasonni, Jean LaMaison, Toni Lundahl, Steen Tinning
1978 Torbjörn Antevik, Andrea Canessa, Marco Durante, Anders Forsbrand, Silvio Grappasonni, François Illouz, Jean LaMaison, Andreas Stamm, Steen Tinning
1977 Carlo Alberto Acutis, Marco Durante, François Illouz, Mats Jonmarker, Christoph Prasthofer, Rolf Seliberg, Ove Sellberg, Ralf Thielemann, Alfonso Vidaor
1966 Jean Delgado, Jean-Michel Larretche, Staffan Mannerström, D Manuel (FRA), Tomas Persson, J C Santandrea (FRA), José Sousa-Mello, Philippe Toussaint
1965 Olivier Brizon, L Giuffre (ITA), Michele Goldschmid, Harald Jochums, G Leven (FRA), Bengt Malmquist, François Thevenin Lemoine, Philippe Toussaint, H Weinhofer (SWE)
1964 Olivier Brizon, Yves Brose, Jean‐Charles Desbordes, Hervé Frayssineau, S Galard de Béarn (FRA), H Hoving (NED), Bernard Pascassio, François Thevenin Lemoine, Philippe Toussaint
1963 L Bjornemann (SWE), Olivier Brizon, Alberto Croze, Hervé Frayssineau, Patrick Frayssineau, Charles Kreglinger, M Rey (SWI), P Sondergaard (DNK), Rüdiger van Gülpen, Anders Werthén
1962 Lars Björk, Hervé Frayssineau, Patrick Frayssineau, Johan Jöhncke, Charles Kreglinger, D B Lane (PRT), Klaus Nierlich, Yves Saubaber, P Sondergaard (DNK), D Walli (SWI), Jürgen Weghmann
1961 S V Andersen (DNK), Stefano Cimatti, Patrick Cros, Martin Hodler, Hans-Hubert Giesen, Mats Göranson, Hans Hedjerson, Friedrich-Carl Janssen, Yves Saubaber, D Walli (SWI), Jürgen Weghmann
1960 S V Andersen (DNK), Carlo Bordogna, Patrick Cros, Alexis Godillot, H Moos (SWI), Jan Olsson, Krister Peil, Yves Saubaber, Enrico Sposetti, Jürgen Weghmann
1959 Prince Alexandre of Belgium, Carlo Bordogna, Patrick Cros, Alexis Godillot, Peter Jochums, Yves Saubaber
1958 Henri-Pierre Bonneau, Patrick Cros, S Gruhn (DNK), Jan Janssen, Claes Jöhncke, Jan Olsson, L Sabini (ITA), Lorenzo Silva, B Sallnas (SWE), Henning Sonstmann

See also
St Andrews Trophy - the equivalent men's amateur event
Junior Vagliano Trophy - the equivalent girls amateur event

References

External links
 Coverage on the R&A's site
 Coverage on the EGA's site

Junior golf tournaments
Team golf tournaments
European international sports competitions
R&A championships